Sheykh Hasan is a village in Najmabad Rural District of the Central District of Nazarabad County, Alborz province, Iran. At the 2006 census, its population was 873 in 220 households. The latest census of 2016 counted 899 people in 258 households; it was the largest village in its rural district.

References 

Nazarabad County

Populated places in Alborz Province

Populated places in Nazarabad County